Agitator may refer to:

Politics
A person who carries out political agitation; see agitation
A member of the Agitators,  political movement and elected representatives of soldiers during the English Civil War
 Levellers, also called Agitators, in English history, representatives for the New Model Army in the Putney Debates
 Agitator (newspaper), a syndicalist newspaper published in Home, Washington, USA from 1910 to 1912

Other
 Agitator (device), a mechanism to put something into motion by shaking or stirring
 Mud agitator
 Industrial agitator
 Agitator (film), a 2001 Japanese film
 Agitator (hockey), a type of ice-hockey player, also known as a pest, who specializes in annoying or distracting opposing players
The Agitator, a 1945 British drama film
The Agitators: The Story of Susan B. Anthony and Frederick Douglass, 2017 play and 2020 podcast

See also 

Agitation (disambiguation)
Silent agitators